The 2009 WNBA season is the 12th season for the Washington Mystics franchise of the Women's National Basketball Association. The Mystics reached the playoffs for the first time in three years. They lost to the Indiana Fever in the first round in a sweep.

Offseason

Dispersal Draft
Based on the Mystics' 2008 record, they would pick 2nd in the Houston Comets dispersal draft. The Mystics picked Matee Ajavon.

WNBA Draft
The following are the Mystics' selections in the 2009 WNBA Draft.

Transactions
June 16: The Mystics signed Kristen Mann and waived Josephine Owino.
June 5: The Mystics waived Bernice Mosby.
June 4: The Mystics waived Kristen Mann and Kelly Schumacher.
June 2: The Mystics waived Eshaya Murphy.
June 1: The Mystics waived Kiesha Brown.
May 11: The Mystics signed Kelly Schumacher waived Coco Miller.
May 1: The Mystics signed Kiesha Brown and waived Crystal Smith and Camille LeNoir.
April 15: The Mystics waived Laurie Koehn, Krystal Vaughn, and Andrea Gardner.
February 9: The Mystics signed free agent Chasity Melvin and waived Miriam Sy and Zane Teilane.
February 6: The Mystics signed Andrea Gardner, Laurie Koehn and Crystal Smith to training camp contracts.
January 30: The Mystics acquired Lindsey Harding, the 23rd pick in the 2009 WNBA Draft, and the second-round pick in the 2010 Draft from the Minnesota Lynx in exchange for the 9th and the 15th picks in the 2009 WNBA Draft.
January 20: The Mystics claimed Kristen Mann off waivers.
September 14, 2008: The Mystics signed Coco Miller to a two-year extension.
August 12, 2008: The Mystics received a second-round pick in the 2009 WNBA Draft (24th overall) from the Detroit Shock as part of the Taj McWilliams-Franklin/Tasha Humphrey transaction.

Free agents

Additions

Subtractions

Roster

Season standings

Schedule

Preseason

|- align="center" bgcolor="ffbbbb"
| 1 || May 21 || 11:00am || @ New York || 71-77 || Sanford (17) || Sanford (8) || Currie (2) || Madison Square Garden  15,958 || 0-1
|- align="center" bgcolor="bbffbb"
| 2 || May 28 || 11:30am || New York || 74-56 || Ajavon (17) || Coleman, Langhorne (6) || Ajavon (3) || Verizon Center  9,287 || 1-1
|-

Regular season

|- align="center" bgcolor="bbffbb"
| 1 || June 6 || 4:00pm || @ Connecticut ||  || 82-70 || Coleman (16) || Sanford, Langhorne (7) || Harding (7) || Mohegan Sun Arena  7,191 || 1-0
|- align="center" bgcolor="bbffbb"
| 2 || June 7 || 4:00pm || Atlanta ||  || 77-71 || Beard (27) || Langhorne (8) || Harding (7) || Verizon Center  11,759 || 2-0
|- align="center" bgcolor="bbffbb"
| 3 || June 10 || 7:30pm || @ Detroit ||  || 75-69 || Beard (15) || Melvin (9) || Harding (5) || Palace of Auburn Hills  7,329 || 3-0
|- align="center" bgcolor="ffbbbb"
| 4 || June 19 || 7:30pm || @ Atlanta ||  || 81-93 || Beard (20) || Langhorne (10) || Currie, Harding (7) || Philips Arena  6,050 || 3-1
|- align="center" bgcolor="bbffbb"
| 6 || June 20 || 7:00pm || Chicago ||  || 81-72 || Beard (31) || Melvin (9) || Beard (5) || Verizon Center  11,745 || 4-1
|- align="center" bgcolor="ffbbbb"
| 6 || June 25 || 7:00pm || Phoenix ||  || 87-93 || Beard (21) || Langhorne (12) || Harding (9) || Verizon Center  9,808 || 4-2
|- align="center" bgcolor="ffbbbb"
| 7 || June 27 || 8:00pm || @ Chicago ||  || 63-68 || Harding (15) || Melvin (9) || Harding (6) || UIC Pavilion  3,918 || 4-3
|- align="center" bgcolor="bbffbb"
| 8 || June 30 || 8:00pm || @ San Antonio ||  || 84-82 || Beard, Harding (19) || Currie (8) || Harding (5) || AT&T Center  4,723 || 5-3
|-

|- align="center" bgcolor="ffbbbb"
| 9 || July 3 || 7:30pm || @ Atlanta ||  || 65-72 || Beard (16) || Melvin (9) || Harding (4) || Philips Arena  5,456 || 5-4
|- align="center" bgcolor="ffbbbb"
| 10 || July 7 || 8:30pm || @ Minnesota ||  || 94-96 (OT) || Harding (27) || Currie (11) || Currie (4) || Target Center  7,171 || 5-5
|- align="center" bgcolor="bbffbb"
| 11 || July 11 || 7:00pm || Los Angeles ||  || 75-63 || Beard (26) || Langhorne (11) || Harding (5) || Verizon Center  12,217 || 6-5
|- align="center" bgcolor="ffbbbb"
| 12 || July 15 || 11:30am || San Antonio ||  || 78-79 || Harding (18) || Beard, Langhorne (6) || Harding (4) || Verizon Center  17,220 || 6-6
|- align="center" bgcolor="bbffbb"
| 13 || July 18 || 7:00pm || New York ||  || 68-67 || Harding (23) || Harding (7) || Harding (5) || Verizon Center  9,968 || 7-6
|- align="center" bgcolor="ffbbbb"
| 14 || July 21 || 7:00pm || Indiana ||  || 70-82 || Harding (17) || Beard (9) || Harding (6) || Verizon Center  9,798 || 7-7
|- align="center" bgcolor="bbffbb"
| 15 || July 23 || 7:00pm || Chicago || ESPN2 || 75-64 || Langhorne (16) || Langhorne (10) || Harding (6) || Verizon Center  11,651 || 8-7
|- align="center" bgcolor="bbffbb"
| 16 || July 26 || 4:00pm|| Sacramento ||  || 87-73 || Langhorne (19) || Langhorne (8) || Beard (5) || Verizon Center  10,757 || 9-7
|- align="center" bgcolor="ffbbbb"
| 17 || July 28 || 7:00pm || @ Indiana ||  || 85-81 || Beard (19) || Langhorne (8) || Harding, Melvin (4) || Conseco Fieldhouse  5,904 || 9-8
|- align="center" bgcolor="bbffbb"
| 18 || July 30 || 7:30pm || @ New York || NBA TVMSG || 78-75 || Beard (28) || Langhorne (11) || Harding (4) || Madison Square Garden  10,172 || 10-8
|-

|- align="center" bgcolor="ffbbbb"
| 19 || August 2 || 4:00pm || Indiana ||  || 79-87 || Beard (23) || Currie (7) || Currie, Harding (4) || Verizon Center  11,595 || 10-9
|- align="center" bgcolor="bbffbb"
| 20 || August 7 || 7:00pm || Detroit ||  || 70-66 || Beard (15) || Langhorne (9) || Harding (4) || Verizon Center  10,637 || 11-9
|- align="center" bgcolor="ffbbbb"
| 21 || August 9 || 3:00pm || @ Connecticut ||  || 67-96 || Beard (18) || Beard, Harding (7) || Beard (6) || Mohegan Sun Arena  6,528 || 11-10
|- align="center" bgcolor="ffbbbb"
| 22 || August 11 || 7:00pm || Detroit ||  || 77-81 || Beard (17) || Sanford (6) || Harding (8) || Verizon Center  10,398 || 11-11
|- align="center" bgcolor="bbffbb"
| 23 || August 14 || 7:00pm || Connecticut ||  || 91-89 (2OT) || Beard (26) || Langhorne (16) || Harding (4) || Verizon Center  9,738 || 12-11
|- align="center" bgcolor="ffbbbb"
| 24 || August 16 || 4:00pm || New York ||  || 59-60 || Beard (18) || Langhorne (8) || Harding (7) || Verizon Center  10,580 || 12-12
|- align="center" bgcolor="ffbbbb"
| 25 || August 18 || 10:30pm || @ Los Angeles ||  || 69-72 || Ajavon (20) || Harding, Langhorne (6) || Ajavon (4) || STAPLES Center  9,287 || 12-13
|- align="center" bgcolor="bbffbb"
| 26 || August 21 || 10:00pm || @ Phoenix ||  || 91-81 || Langhorne (19) || Langhorne (12) || Harding (6) || US Airways Center  9,155 || 13-13
|- align="center" bgcolor="ffbbbb"
| 27 || August 22 || 10:00pm || @ Sacramento ||  || 60-82 || Langhorne (16) || Langhorne (10) || Harding (3) || ARCO Arena  7,067 || 13-14
|- align="center" bgcolor="ffbbbb"
| 28 || August 25 || 10:00pm || @ Seattle ||  || 68-78 || Coleman, Currie (13) || Currie (6) || Ajavon (3) || KeyArena  6,791 || 13-15
|- align="center" bgcolor="bbffbb"
| 29 || August 30 || 4:00pm || Minnesota ||  || 81-75 || Langhorne (18) || Langhorne (10) || Hardin (5) || Verizon Center  12,241 || 14-15
|-

|- align="center" bgcolor="bbffbb"
| 30 || September 3 || 7:00pm || Seattle ||  || 78-67 || Currie (17) || Langhorne (11) || Harding (5) || Verizon Center  10,648 || 15-15
|- align="center" bgcolor="ffbbbb"
| 31 || September 4 || 8:30pm || @ Chicago ||  || 86-92 || Ajavon (32) || Langhorne (10) || Harding (5) || UIC Pavilion  3,241 || 15-16
|- align="center" bgcolor="ffbbbb"
| 32 || September 6 || 4:00pm || @ Indiana ||  || 61-72 || Langhorne (13) || Sanford (10) || Sanford (3) || Conseco Fieldhouse  9,702 || 15-17
|- align="center" bgcolor="bbffbb"
| 33 || September 12 || 7:00pm || Atlanta  ||  || 82-64 || Harding (25) || Langhorne (8) || Currie (5) || Verizon Center  11,987 || 16-17
|- align="center" bgcolor="ffbbbb"
| 34 || September 13 || 4:00pm || @ New York || MSG || 65-86 || Currie (17) || Ajavon (9) || Currie (5) || Madison Square Garden  15,667 || 16-18
|-

| All games are viewable on WNBA LiveAccess

Postseason

|- align="center" bgcolor="ffbbbb"
| 1 || September 17 || 7:00pm || Indiana || ESPN2 || 79-88 || Langhorne (18) || Langhorne (10) || Melvin (4) || Comcast Center  6,332 || 0-1
|- align="center" bgcolor="ffbbbb"
| 2 || September 19 || 7:00pm || @ Indiana || NBA TV || 74-81 (OT) || Langhorne (15) || Currie (14) || Harding (5) || Conseco Fieldhouse  9,655 || 0-2
|-

Regular Season Statistics

Player Statistics

Team Statistics

Awards and honors
Alana Beard was named WNBA Eastern Conference Player of the Week for the week of June 22, 2009.
Alana Beard was named WNBA Eastern Conference Player of the Week for the week of July 6, 2009.
Alana Beard was named to the 2009 WNBA All-Star Team as an Eastern Conference starter.
Crystal Langhorne was named the Most Improved Player.
Alana Beard was named to the All-Defensive Second Team.

References

External links

Washington
Washington Mystics
Washington Mystics seasons